Seminole Hard Rock Hotel & Casino Hollywood, also known as The Guitar Hotel, due to its tower constructed to resemble a Gibson Les Paul guitar, is a hotel and casino resort near Hollywood, Florida, United States, located on  of the Hollywood Reservation of the Seminole Tribe of Florida. The property currently has three hotel towers, a  casino, large poker room, a  lagoon-style pool facility with a center bar and many private restaurants, shops, spa, cabanas, bars and nightclubs, and the Hard Rock Event Center. A large expansion was completed in October 2019.

Hotel 

The resort currently has a 12-story "classic Hard Rock Hotel" with 469 guest rooms and suites. The resort has  of meeting space, including a  exhibit hall.

The Hard Rock's $1.3 billion property expansion project added a  tower designed to appear as a pair of guitars, back-to-back, with lights providing the imagery of guitar strings and 638 rooms alongside a seven-story, 168-room "Oasis Tower" overlooking the pool cabanas—all scheduled to open on October 24, 2019, several months in advance of Super Bowl LIV being held in Miami on February 2, 2020. The expansion also included a  "Rock Spa", and over 20 new dining and nightlife destinations. Between the existing 12-story hotel, new Guitar Hotel, and new Oasis Tower, over 1,200 hotel rooms became available in October 2019.

On May 9, 2014, Seminole Chief Jim Billie announced a $100 million upgrade of the tribe's casinos, with much of that spent on the Hard Rock Hollywood location, including improved entryways, center pool bar, pool facility upgrades, updated hotel room and suite interiors, and a new restaurant. As of March 2019, the tribe's upgrade budget was significantly increased to over $2.4 billion, split mainly between this location and the Seminole Hard Rock Hotel and Casino Tampa.

Casino 
The current casino layout covers over  featuring slot machines and various table games including blackjack, baccarat, mini baccarat, Pai Gow poker, Let It Ride and three card poker. The casino does not have live craps and roulette, although there are electronic versions of those games available. As of June 2018, the poker room is located in a former ballroom area, relocated from its prior venue due to ongoing construction work.

Blackjack is the most popular card game in the United States and was an addition to the casino. In a deal valued at $1.1 billion, former Governor Charlie Crist gave the Seminole Tribe a license for blackjack in its casinos. In exchange, The Seminole Tribe loaned the State of Florida $1.1 billion over the course of two years. On July 3, 2008, the Florida Supreme Court ruled that the governor's agreement was unconstitutional, but table games continue to operate because the Federal Department of the Interior approved the now-invalid pact with the state. The addition of blackjack to the Hard Rock casinos in Hollywood and Tampa gave credibility to its claim of being a major gambling destination.

Entertainment

Hard Rock Live 

Hard Rock Live is a 7,000 seat multi-purpose theater, which opened on October 25, 2019 with a concert by Maroon 5. The theater replaced a 5,500 seat arena (razed in March 2018 as part of the property-wide expansion) of the same name, which hosted different types of events including musical acts, comedians, boxing and other smaller events, along with a residency by Billy Joel. During construction of the new theater, events were held at the temporary 3,500 seat Hard Rock Event Center, which hosted acts including Britney Spears on her Piece of Me Tour.

Miss Universe 2020 

The 69th edition of the Miss Universe competition, was held on May 16, 2021 at the Seminole Hard Rock Hotel & Casino where Zozibini Tunzi of South Africa crowned her successor Andrea Meza of Mexico at the end of the event.

Notable incidents
Model Anna Nicole Smith, who was staying at the resort, died in her hotel suite on February 8, 2007. An autopsy ruled her death was caused by an accidental drug overdose from prescription drugs.

See also

List of casinos in Florida

References 
Notes

Further reading

External links 

Hard Rock Cafe
Casinos in Florida
Casinos completed in 2004
Hotel buildings completed in 2004
Hotels established in 2004
Native American casinos
Buildings and structures in Hollywood, Florida
Tourist attractions in Broward County, Florida
Seminole Tribe of Florida
American companies established in 2004
Casino hotels
The Cordish Companies
2004 establishments in Florida
Native American history of Florida
Hotels in Broward County, Florida